All Saints' Church, Annesley is a parish church in the Church of England in Annesley, Nottinghamshire.

The church is Grade II* listed by the Department for Digital, Culture, Media and Sport as it is a particularly significant building of more than local interest.

History
The church was erected in 1874 to a design by the architect Thomas Graham Jackson to replace the old church on the Annesley estate. Until 1942 services were held at both sites.

The interior of the church was destroyed by fire in 1907 but was re-opened in 1909. The chief glories of the church are the Norman font and the East window.

The church contains the achievement of arms of Patrick Chaworth, 3rd Viscount Chaworth which was moved here from the old church in 1874, as were many other monuments.

Parish structure
It is in a group of parishes with
All Saints' Church, Annesley
St. Mary the Virgin, Newstead
St. Mary's Church, Newstead Abbey

Organ
The National Pipe Organ Register lists the organ to be a three manual instrument built by F. Rothwell of Harrow.

List of organists
William Henry Renshaw 1897 - ca. 1912 - ????

Sources

Annesley
Grade II* listed churches in Nottinghamshire
Churches completed in 1874
19th-century Church of England church buildings